Dondaicha-Warwade is a town and consists of a municipal council in Sindkheda Taluka in the Dhule District of Khandesh Region in the state of Maharashtra in India.

History 
Under Maharao Jadavrao and Rao Shinde's of Dhanur, Dondaicha Village became part of West Khandesh in 1500s.

1400s to 1700s Shinde's became Rao of west Khandesh under Jadhavrao Rulers of Khandesh :-

The Shinde/Scindia (Sarpatils) of Khandesh. Who came from Amirgarh (Present in Rajasthan) as Rao of West Khandesh in and 14th century. In past they are Rai Amirgarh and ancestors of Sindh's Royal Family. They control Khandesh from Laling fort and Dhanur & Dhule Towns. In 1600s Jadhavrao lost ruling power against Mughal but after some time later Rao Shinde recaptured Khandesh with the help of Maratha Empire. In 1700s they came under Maratha Empire lead by Chhatrapati Sambhaji and after some year later they lost the Administrative and Ruler power against Mughal Empire lead by Aurangzeb in war.

Maratha rule 
Maratha raids into Khandesh began in 1670 with Shinde's Rao of West Khandesh and the following century was a period of unrest as Mughals and Marathas competed for control.  In 1760, the Peshwa ousted the Mughal ruler and gained control of Khandesh, following which portions were granted to Holkar and Shinde/Scindia rulers. Baji Rao II surrendered to the British in June 1818, but sporadic war continued in Khandesh which was among the last of the Peshwa's former territories to come under complete British control.

Demographics 
 India census, Dondaicha-Warwade had a population of 46,767. Males constitute 52% of the population and females 48%. Dondaicha-Warwade has an average literacy rate of 71%, higher than the national average of 59.5%: male literacy is 77% and, female literacy is 65%. In Dondaicha-Warwade, 14% of the population is under 6 years of age.

References 

Cities and towns in Dhule district